Rugby Club Rad Belgrade (Serbian: Рагби Клуб Рад Београд) is a rugby union club from Belgrade, Serbia. RK Rad, previously known as RK Pobednik,  is one of the biggest rugby clubs within the former Yugoslavia, having won ten national championships and seven national cup trophies. The club is a member of the Serbian Rugby Union.

History

In December 1996, a group of enthusiasts and lovers of rugby, led by Bosko Strugar, founded Rugby Club Pobednik. The early years were not easy as there were no pitches or club house. However, all members helped develop the club which brought results quickly. In difficult times, the players bought the required equipment and funded travel so the club could survive. The club is now sponsored by Mozzart Sports Betting.

In December 2014 Pobednik was renamed Rad. This was previously the name of its associated junior rugby club, after a link was established with football club FK Rad. In English, Rad translates as "work" or "labour", and the football club was formed by the Serbian construction company of the same name. RK Rad's president Marko Kapor is also on the board of directors of FK Rad. The club wears a blue and white kit.

Domestic competitions
In the 1997/1998 season Pobednik joined the Rugby Championship of SR Yugoslavia and reached the playoffs. The first game ended with the triumph, with victory over the well-established club KBRK (now BRK Red Star). Ultimately Ragbi Klub Partizan took the championship in that season, but only two years later Pobednik defeated Partizan to become the new States champion. Pobednik won their second title the following year, and extended the winning streak to claim seven straight Championships from 2007 to 2013. Pobednik has also won 4 domestic Cups.

Regional league
Regional Rugby Championship started in 2007, 3 teams from Serbia, 3 teams from Croatia, 2 teams from Slovenia, 3 teams from Hungary, 2 teams from Bosnia and Herzegovina, one team from Greece and one team from Austria. RC Pobednik were the runners-up in 4 seasons between 2007 and 2012.

Club honours
Rugby Championship of SR Yugoslavia:
Winners (2): 2000, 2001

Rugby Championship of Serbia:
Winners (9): 2007, 2008, 2009, 2010, 2011, 2012, 2013, 2017, 2022

Rugby Cup of Serbia:
Winners (8): 2006, 2009, 2012, 2013, 2017, 2018, 2020, 2022

Regional Rugby Championship:
Runners Up (4): 2008, 2009, 2011, 2012

Records
Most Appearances: Marko Kapor - 113 
Top Points Scorer: Marko Kapor - 543

Current squad
The club currently has more than a hundred members who compete in five categories. The youth categories are the greatest source of the club's strength with talented young players being produced every year. Pobednik (now Rad) has provided more national representative players for Serbia than any other club.

2016 Team

Personnel

Team officials
President: Marko Kapor
Technical Director: Marko Jovanović
Team Manager: Dejan Ranđelović
Head Coach: Milan Orlović
Forwards Coach: Marko Ristić
Backs Coach: Miladin Živanov
Doctor: Srđan Nikolić
Youth coaches: Marko Žeravica and Zoran Mičić

Club 100
The following players are members of the 100 club, having played 100 or more games for the club:

Kapor Marko, Rastovac Milan, Vuković Goran, Nikolić Srđan, Radulović Vladimir, Labus Jerko, Marković Predrag, Vraneš Predrag, Ristić Marko, Kapor Branko, Orlović Milan, Živanov Miladin, Jovanović Nebojša, Simonović Nemanja, Đukić Vladimir

Foreign players

  Greguar Delhyne
  Vincent Schmidt
  Logaivau Mule Apisai
  Stuart Rudge
  Jabulane Tulisani
  David Ruggery

Notable former players

  Jerko Labus
  Goran Vuković (rugby player)
  Srdjan Nikolic
  Milan Rastovac
  Marko Kapor
  Predrag Marković (rugby player)
  Danilo Bulatović

External links
 Official Site

References

Serbian rugby union teams
Rugby clubs established in 1996